Diego Uribe Vargas (1 November 1931 – 12 August 2022) was a Colombian diplomat and politician. A member of the Colombian Liberal Party, he served as Minister of Foreign Affairs from 1978 to 1981.

Uribe died in Bogotá on 12 August 2022, at the age of 90.

References

1931 births
2022 deaths
Colombian Liberal Party politicians
Colombian diplomats
Ambassadors of Colombia to France
Ambassadors of Colombia to Peru
Governors of Cundinamarca Department
Members of the Chamber of Representatives of Colombia
Foreign ministers of Colombia
University of Valladolid alumni
Del Rosario University alumni
Academic staff of the National University of Colombia
Grand Crosses of the Order of the Sun of Peru
Politicians from Bogotá